Dowraq (or Dawraq) was a town located in Khuzestan, 78 km southeast of the city Ahvaz. The town fell into ruins in the 18th century; a new settlement to the south was constructed during this period, known today as Shadegan.

References

Sources 
 
 
 

Former populated places in Khuzestan Province
Historical geography of Iran